Wishbone is an American half-hour live-action children's television show produced from 1995 to 1997 about a dog who relives famous literature. It was originally broadcast on PBS and later rebroadcast on PBS Kids and PBS Kids Go!. The show won four Daytime Emmys, a Peabody Award, and honors from the Television Critics Association. Wishbone'''s exterior shots were filmed on the backlot of Lyrick Studios's teen division Big Feats! Entertainment in Allen, Texas, and its interior shots were filmed on a sound stage in a  warehouse in Plano, Texas. Additional scenes were filmed in Grapevine, Texas.

This show garnered particular praise for refusing to bowdlerize many of the sadder or more unpleasant aspects of the source works, which usually enjoyed a fairly faithful retelling in the fantasy sequences. 

The show also inspired several book series. Altogether, more than fifty books have featured Wishbone, which continued to be published even after the TV series ended production. In 1998, the TV movie Wishbone's Dog Days of the West was aired.

A film adaptation of the series from Universal Pictures and Mattel Films is in the works with Peter Farrelly serving as producer.

Plot
The show's title character is a Jack Russell Terrier. Wishbone lives with his owner Joe Talbot in the fictional town of Oakdale, Texas. He daydreams about being the lead character of stories from classic literature. He was known as "the little dog with a big imagination." Only the viewers and the characters in his daydreams can hear Wishbone speak. The characters from his daydreams see Wishbone as whichever famous character he is currently portraying and not as a dog.

Episodes

A standard episode of Wishbone consists of an opening scene, introducing Wishbone's and his family's current situation (for example, Arbor Day planting a tree, or Joe catching a lunch lady attempting to donate food to a homeless shelter). When one of the main characters decides to get involved in the noble act, Wishbone flashes to a famous work of literature that it reminds him of, usually with him playing the lead role in costume. Wishbone may not play the lead role if the character is difficult to relate to (he plays Sancho Panza in Don Quixote) or is female (in the show's "Joan of Arc" episode, he plays Louis de Conte). By the end of both stories, the real-life situation usually follows the work of literature closely, such as the King saving Robin Hood at the last minute and the Principal saving Joe at the last minute. The last two minutes of nearly every episode feature Wishbone narrating some background description of how the episode was produced, including how stunts were performed, how costumes were designed, or how the visual effects were created.

The series also featured a clip show episode called "Picks of the Litter."

Cast
 Soccer the Dog as Wishbone (Larry Brantley as the voice of Wishbone)
Jordan Wall as Joseph "Joe" Talbot
 Christie Abbott as Samantha "Sam" Kepler
 Adam Springfield as David Barnes
 Mary Chris Wall as Ellen MacMillan Talbot
 Angee Hughes as Wanda Gilmore
 Jarrad Kritzstein as Jimmy Kidd 
 Julio Cedillo as Travis del Rio 
 Mikaila Enriquez as Melina Finch 
 Paul English, Jr. as Marcus Finch 
 Alex Morris as Nathaniel "Nathan" Barnes 
 Maria Arita as Ruth Vincent Barnes
 Jazmine McGill as Emily Barnes (season 1)
 Brittany Holmes as Emily Barnes (season 2)
 Justin Reese as Nathaniel Bobelesky
 Akin Babatunde as Homer Vincent
 Adan Sanchez as Lee Natonabah/Dan Bloodgood
 Rick Perkins as Mr. Bob Pruitt
 Joe Duffield as Damont Jones
 Taylor Pope as Curtis

Characters
Main

 Wishbone: The protagonist and titular character of the series. He is a well-read dog who sees parallels between classic literature and the dilemmas he and his human friends face every day. Wishbone is a male tri-color Jack Russell Terrier (white with brown and black markings) who lives with the Talbots at their home on Forest Avenue in Oakdale.
 Joseph "Joe" Talbot: Wishbone's teenage owner, the only child of Steve and Ellen Talbot. Joe has brown hair and a great interest in sports, particularly basketball. He is a player on the Sequoyah Middle School basketball team. His best friends are Sam Kepler and David Barnes. His father, Steve, a basketball coach, died from a rare blood disease when Joe was six years old. Portrayed by Jordan Wall. In the series finale Joe is considering playing the drums in the high school jazz band.
 Samantha "Sam" Kepler: Joe and David's best friend from their school. Her father, Walter Kepler, owns and runs the local pizzeria, Pepper Pete's. She has long blonde hair and is the most outgoing and adventurous of the three friends. She is allergic to coconuts.  Sam is a tomboy who enjoys soccer, roller hockey, photography, and drama. Her parents are divorced. Portrayed by Christie Abbott.
David Barnes: Joe and Sam's best friend from school and Joe's next-door neighbor. He lives with his parents, Nathan and Ruth Barnes, and his younger sister, Emily. David aspires to be a scientist. David and his family aren't seen or mentioned in "Wishbone's Dog Days of the West." Portrayed by Adam Springfield.
 Ellen Talbot (née MacMillan): Joe's widowed mother, who, like him, has dark brown hair. She works as the reference librarian at Henderson Memorial Library in Oakdale. It is revealed in an old high school yearbook that her maiden name is MacMillan.
 Wanda Gilmore: The Talbots and The Barnes' slightly eccentric next-door neighbor. Wanda is the owner of the Oakdale Chronicle newspaper and president of the local Historical Society and a volunteer in other different venues. She is a very friendly and cheerful person but hates it when Wishbone digs up her flower beds and finds him a nuisance at times (although she reconciles with him in a later episode, "A Fleabitten Bargain"). She has a crush on Joe, David, and Sam's teacher, Bob Pruitt, and is in a steady relationship with him. She is portrayed by Angee Hughes.

Recurring
 Robin: Joe, David, and Sam's friend. She loves playing basketball. Codie Brooks portrays her.
Nathan Barnes: Ruth's husband, David and Emily's father, Homer's brother-in-law, and Steve and Ellen's best friend. Nathan adores his family. Alex Morris portrays him.
Ruth Barnes (née Vincent): Nathan's wife, David and Emily's mother, Homer's sister, and Steve and Ellen's best friend. Ruth always reminds Emily and Tina to be good. In "Bark That Bark," it is revealed that her maiden name is Vincent. Maria Arita portrays her.
 Damont Jones: The antagonist of the series. He is Oakdale's bully, always up to no good, who usually causes trouble with Curtis. Wishbone loathes Damont to the point of doing some comedic harm to him, especially during Oakdale's Halloween scavenger hunt.  In one of the final episodes, an older and wiser Damont tentatively apologizes to Joe for his previous unfriendly attitude, and it is implied that they make peace. Damont starts having a good friendship with him afterward. Joe Duffield portrays him.
 Jimmy Kidd: Damont's harmless but often obnoxious cousin; he tells long-winded grandiose tales of supposed past events which he claims that he or acquaintances of his experience. His carelessness and overly-confident nature get not only him into trouble but also those who pal around with him; in one case, when he and Marcus are left unsupervised at Pepper Pete's, they ruin an entire lot of pizzas while trying to bake them. He appears in the second season of this series. Portrayed by Jarrad Kritzstein.
 Emily Barnes: David's naughty little sister is often seen with her best friend, Tina. A running gag seems to involve an adult telling Emily and Tina to be good, to which they reply in unison, "we will," before giggling insincerely and making a plan to cook up some mischief. Emily also has an overt affinity for Wishbone; in the Season 1 episode "Homer Sweet Homer," she had him for show and tell, but she wanted to keep him for herself until Joe, David, and Sam came to get him back. She also plays t-ball for the Oakdale Tigers. In Season 1, Emily is in kindergarten, and in Season 2, Emily is in 1st grade. Jazmine McGill portrays her in season 1 and by Brittany Holmes in Season 2.
 Amanda Hollings: Sam's arrogantly jealous academic rival always tries to prove that she is smarter than Sam. Elena Hurst portrays her.
 Mr. Robert "Bob" Pruitt: Joe, David, and Sam's English teacher, who has a genuine love of the subject and is very encouraging of his students, teaching them how to express themselves through written works. Later, Bob becomes a love interest of Wanda and enters into a relationship with her. Rick Perkins portrayed him.
 Walter Kepler: Sam's dad and a friend of Joe Talbot's deceased father, Steve. He owns and operates Pepper Pete's Pizzeria in the later episodes. Bob Reed portrayed him.
 Nathaniel Bobelesky: A geeky kid who is terrible at sports but is still friends with Joe, David, and Sam. After he shows a natural talent for swiftly catching things, Sam helps Nathaniel become a hockey goalie, which earns him the respect of several players, including Damont. In another episode, he is revealed to be allergic to many things, especially dogs, although most of his allergies were in his imagination. Justin Reese portrays him.
 Homer Vincent: David and Emily's maternal uncle, Ruth's brother, and Nathan's brother-in-law. He is the storyteller of traditional African folklore. He appears in the first season episode "Bark That Bark." Portrayed by Akin Babatunde.
 Lee Natonabah: A Native American who is a college professor in Dances with Dogs. A good friend of Joe Talbot's deceased father, Steve, relates to Joe several remarkable accomplishments that Steve had performed. The actor Adan Sanchez acted as Oakdale's postman Dan Bloodgood throughout the show's second season.
 Travis Del Rio: Oakdale's Sports and Games store owner and Melina and Marcus' uncle. He only appears in the second season of this series and the TV movie. In the Season 2 episode Halloween Hound, it is revealed that he likes dogs, and he assures Joe that Wishbone is more than welcome in Oakdale's Sports and Games. He is portrayed by Julio Cedillo.
 Melina Finch: Travis Del Rio's niece and Marcus' sister, who only appears in the second season and the TV movie. Melina enjoys singing and is a member of the Oakdale Glee Club. She is portrayed by Mikaila Enriquez.
 Marcus Finch: Travis Del Rio's nephew and Melina's brother. He’s well behaved, but in one episode was led astray by Jimmy. He only appears in the second season of this series and the TV movie. Paul English, Jr, portrays him.
 Mr. King: A real estate developer who is an occasional antagonist of Joe, David, Sam, and Wishbone. John S. Davies portrays him.

ProductionWishbone was conceived by Rick Duffield after brainstorming with his staff about "making a show for kids that was told from a dog's point of view". In an interview with The New Yorker, Duffield recalled that he had a habit of putting a voice to his dog's expressions. His eureka moment came when he was staring at a row of books on his shelf: "The one that caught my eye that day was Frank Magill's Masterpieces of World Literature. Well, what if a little dog with a big imagination could take us into some of the greatest stories ever told? And, why not make him the hero?"

Inspired, Duffield produced a seven-minute pilot for the show. In the summer of 1993, he spent three days casting for the dog star at a motel courtyard in Valencia, California, looking at between 100 and 150 dogs. He elaborated in the interview with The New Yorker: "[A]n extraordinary little Jack Russell named Soccer walked up and dazzled us all. I filmed the teaser, which captured Wishbone's character, suggested the show's format, and brought it to Alice Cahn at PBS. I suppose convincing someone that it was a good idea came down to executing a pretty fetching dog trick!"

Duffield told Entertainment Tonight: "Keeping up with the variety in the series is the biggest challenge. Because Wishbone is the central figure of each show and plays an integral role in the contemporary story and the literary story, he's in almost every scene. So he has a lot to do and designing scenes that can work with a dog, with period actors and period sets, as well as kids in a contemporary world is a big challenge."

Larry Brantley, the voice of Wishbone, said he got the job through: "...the weirdest audition I think that's ever been or will ever be. I didn't know what the dog looked like, and they give (me) the barest of information, 'there's going to be this great new kids show with this dog that talks and we want you to come in, and we want you to be funny' so I went to the first audition having no idea what to do. In the callback, I got to meet Soccer for the first time...It was a five-minute impromptu audition...I never really read from the script, I was supposed to, but I didn't. Rick Duffield, the executive producer, said, 'well, watch the dog and just follow along and see what he's doing right now.' Soccer was obsessing like over this tennis ball...and he wasn't interested in Rick Duffield or me or anybody else in the room; it was like a tennis ball. And he would stare at the tennis ball. I want the tennis ball...So it was like five minutes about a tennis ball, and I walked out of the audition saying, 'I can't believe I just did five minutes about a tennis ball.' And then I got the job. We may never understand."

Ultimately, Duffield wanted Wishbone to be an: "...entertaining way for kids to get their first taste of great books. We believe this show can cultivate a new appetite for reading by making kids think it's fun to get to know these books. And it's intended to be fun, action-packed, clever, and a way to get their first taste of great stories that can become a valuable educational stepping stone in their lives. The dog makes it all the more endearing and entertaining."

Despite acclaim from critics and educators, only 50 episodes were produced. The first 40 episodes were shown as a single-season run in 1995, while the remaining ten episodes became the second season in 1997–1998. Duffield told author Michael Brody that PBS halted production because the show did not have "merchandising potential".

 Broadcast 
The series aired on PBS and premiered in the United States on October 8, 1995. The final episode aired on December 7, 1997. After the series ended, reruns continued to air until August 31, 2001. The series returned in reruns on PBS Kids Go! on June 2, 2007. Wishbone clips came to the PBS Kids Go! website. The return to PBS lasted a short time, although some PBS stations continued to air Wishbone until October 7, 2013.

The show also aired on Nickelodeon in the UK and Ireland and on Nine Network in Australia.

Home media
Only a handful of the Wishbone episodes have been released to VHS and DVD. There were also a few computer games in 1996 and 1997, such as Wishbone Activity Center, Wishbone Print Tricks, and Wishbone and the Amazing Odyssey.  Wishbone has also inspired several book series: Wishbone Classics, Wishbone Mysteries, and The Adventures of Wishbone, which is similar to the TV series.

In 2004, HIT Entertainment released 4 DVDs of the show: "Hot Diggety Dawg," "The Impawsible Dream," "The Hunchdog of Notre-Dame," and "Paw Prints of Thieves."

On February 15, 2011, HIT Entertainment (distributed by Lionsgate) released the Wishbone DVD, The Little Dog With a Big Imagination, which only includes the four previously released episodes.

 Awards 

 Academy of Television Arts & Sciences First Honor Roll of Children's Programming, 1999
 George Foster Peabody Award, 1998
 Emmy Award – Art Direction/Set Decoration/Scenic Design, 1997
 Emmy Award – Costume Design/Styling, 1997
 Emmy Award – Graphics and Title Design, 1997
 Emmy Award – Costume Design/Styling, 1996
 Emmy Award Nominations, 1998, "WISHBONE's Dog Days of the West."
 Directing in a Children's Special
 Art Direction/Set Decoration/Scenic Design
 Main Title Design
 Costume Design/Styling
 Television Critics Association – Best Children's Show, 1996 and 1997

 Film adaptation 
On July 15, 2020, it was announced that Universal Pictures and Mattel's film division are developing a film adaptation of the series. Peter Farrelly will produce the film while Roy Parker will write the screenplay and Robbie Brenner will executive produce. In a statement by Brenner, "Our deep library of iconic franchises continues to offer cinematic storytelling opportunities. We’re thrilled to be working with Peter Farrelly, Roy Parker, and Universal to take the beloved dog classic into a new direction with a modern reimagination of the franchise."

It will be the first theatrical collaboration between Universal and Mattel and the ninth Mattel Films project in development, as well as the second "Wishbone" film in the franchise. The first movie in the "Wishbone" franchise was the popular 1998 TV movie Wishbone's Dog Days of the West''.

See also 
 Barney & Friends
 Kidsongs
 The Puzzle Place
 Groundling Marsh

References

External links 
 

1990s American children's television series
1995 American television series debuts
1997 American television series endings
American children's education television series
American children's fantasy television series
English-language education television programming
PBS Kids shows
PBS original programming
Peabody Award-winning television programs
Reading and literacy television series
Television series based on classical mythology
Television series by Mattel Creations
Television shows about dogs
Television shows filmed in Texas
Television shows set in Texas
Television shows adapted into novels
Television shows based on books
Elementary school television series